Southern Tsimshian,  or , is the southern dialect of the Tsimshian language, spoken by the Gitga'ata and Kitasoo Tsimshians in Klemtu, B.C. It became extinct with the death of the last remaining speaker, Violet Neasloss.

 is close to Coast Tsimshian and has been described as a highly conservative dialect, however the two may not have been mutually intelligible with Coast Tsimshian. The name  means "the language beside."

Specialist John Asher Dunn wrote several articles on the language, from which the term Southern Tsimshian arose.

Notes

Further reading

Tsimshianic languages
Indigenous languages of the Pacific Northwest Coast
Indigenous languages of Alaska
First Nations languages in Canada
Languages extinct in the 2010s
Extinct languages of North America